Renata Müller (11 February 1937 – 29 July 2021) was a Spanish gymnast. She competed in six events at the 1960 Summer Olympics. Müller died on 29 July 2021, at the age of 84.

References

External links
 

1937 births
2021 deaths
Spanish female artistic gymnasts
Olympic gymnasts of Spain
Gymnasts at the 1960 Summer Olympics
Gymnasts from Barcelona
20th-century Spanish women